National Dental College Derabassi was established in 1999 at village Gulabgarh, Dera Bassi, India (near Chandigarh) by Medical Educational and Rural Welfare Society. The college is affiliated to Baba Farid University of Health Sciences, Faridkot and approved by Govt. of India Ministry of Health and Family Welfare, New Delhi.

The College Management Committee is headed by Lt. Col. Gurbir Singh Sandhu as President and Col. K. S. Cheema as Secretary.S. Dilbag Singh Sandhu of Shri Hargobindpur have contributed towards the development of this college. The College runs its own non-functional multi-specialty 100 bedded Hospital with Medicine and Surgery as main Departments. Guided and funded mostly by NRIs, Doctors and Army officers.

Co-curriculum, sports, Graduation ceremonies, Fresher's Party and College Fest is discouraged.
Gate opens strictly at 3PM, before the time no one is allowed to leave the campus.

Managing Staff
Dr. (Air Cmde) S. K. Taneja, AVSM (Retd.), looks after the planning of building and development of faculties. He is the founder advisor/consultant of the college. 
Dr. (Maj Gen) V. K. Sood, former Director General of Army Dental Corp, looks after the execution of the faculties and advises the Management on all academic activities.
Dr. (Lt.Col) S. K. Dhawan, MBBS, looks after the General Hospital as Medical Superintendent and in charge. 
Dr Vinay S Dua is the Director-Principal of the college since May 2016.

Alumni 

Meenakshi Chaudhary, Femina Miss India 2018

Educational institutions established in 1999
Universities and colleges in Punjab, India
Dental colleges in India
1999 establishments in Punjab, India